Braidwood railway station served the village of Braidwood, South Lanarkshire, Scotland from 1848 to 1962 on the Caledonian main line.

History 
The station opened in August 1848 by the Caledonian Railway. To the west was the goods yard with sidings that served Nellfield Saw Mills. To the east was the signal box and more sidings, one to the north serving Meadow Brick Works. The station closed to passengers on 2 July 1962 and closed to goods traffic on 6 July 1964.

References

External links 

Disused railway stations in South Lanarkshire
Former Caledonian Railway stations
Railway stations in Great Britain opened in 1848
Railway stations in Great Britain closed in 1962
1848 establishments in Scotland
1962 disestablishments in Scotland